The University Athletic Association of the Philippines (UAAP)-National Collegiate Athletic Association (NCAA) All-Star Game is an interleague basketball game between selected players of the UAAP and the NCAA. Several side events, such as the slam dunk contest, were held from 2004 onwards. Prior to 2004, it was an interleague tournament between the semifinalists of both leagues.

The proceeds of the games proceed to Bantay Bata, an ABS-CBN foundation for needy children.

Summaries

All-star games
Notes:
*Best of 3 series
**UAAP was composed of only 7 schools as La Salle was suspended.
***NCAA was composed of only 7 schools as PCU was suspended.

Side events

2002

The 2002 tournament had three stages: the elimination round was an inter-league affair, but the standings are based between teams of the same league. The top two teams advance to a single round-robin semifinals. The two best teams from the semifinals dispute the championship in a best of three series.

Elimination round

NCAA

UAAP

Semi-finals

Finals
UE def. Ateneo, 2 games to none.

2003
The 2003 tournament was a single-elimination tournament, with the seedings based on the final positions in their respective leagues. UAAP runner-up Ateneo didn't join, so they were replaced with 5th placer Adamson.

All-star games:
 UAAP South 94-77 NCAA East
 UAAP North 62-57 NCAA West
Slam dunk contest: Niño Canaleta (UE)
Three-point shootout: Wynsjohn Te (JRU)
2-ball competition: Louie Abad and Titus Mendoza (CSB)

2004
All-star games:
 UAAP (FEU/UST/UP/NU) 58-54 NCAA (PCU/Letran/Mapua/JRU)
All-star MVP: Toti Almeda (UP)
 UAAP (Adamson/Ateneo/La Salle/UE) 64-67 NCAA (UPHR/San Beda/San Sebastian/CSB)
All-star MVP: Leo Najorda (San Sebastian)
Slam dunk contest: Niño Canaleta (UE)
Three-point shootout: Chris Tiu (Ateneo)
2-ball competition: Patrick Cabahug and Leo Canuday (Adamson)

2005
All-star games:
UAAP (Adamson/FEU/NU/UE) 64-76 NCAA (JRU/PCU/San Sebastian/UPHDS)
All-star MVP: Leo Najorda (San Sebastian)
UAAP (Ateneo/La Salle/UP/UST) 81-88 NCAA (Letran/CSB/Mapua/San Beda)
All-star MVP: Boyet Bautista (Letran)
Slam dunk contest: Rey Guevarra (Letran)
Three-point shootout: Alex Angeles (San Beda)
2-ball competition: JB Sison and Jay-R Tecson (San Beda)

2006
All-star games:
UAAP Juniors 64-72 NCAA Juniors
All-star MVP: Dave Marcelo (San Beda)
UAAP Seniors 83-78 NCAA Seniors
All-star MVP: Jojo Duncil (UST)
Slam dunk contest: Elmer Espiritu (UE)
Three-point shootout: Chris Tiu (Ateneo)
2-ball competition: Jim Viray and Anthony del Rio (San Sebastian)

2007
All-star game UAAP 78-83 NCAA
All-star MVP: RJ Jazul (Letran)
Slam dunk contest: Rey Guevarra (Letran)
Three-point shootout: JV Casio (La Salle)
2-ball competition: Martin Reyes and Vicmel Epres (UP)

2008
UAAP Juniors 90-78 NCAA Juniors 
All-star MVP: Mark Juruena (Adamson) 
All-star game UAAP 91-80 NCAA
All-star MVP: Jervy Cruz (UST)
Slam dunk contest: Elmer Espiritu (UE)
Three-point shootout: Clark Bautista (UST)

2009
NCAA Juniors 85-84 UAAP Juniors 
All-star MVP: Arthur dela Cruz (San Beda)
NCAA Seniors 76-60 UAAP Seniors
All-star MVP: Jimbo Aquino (San Sebastian)
Slam dunk contest: Allein Maliksi (UST)
Three-point shootout: John Wilson (JRU)
Father-son 2-3 ball: Joel and Ael Banal

2010
NCAA Juniors 85-81 UAAP Juniors 
All-star MVP: Baser Amer (San Beda)
UAAP Seniors 90-76 NCAA Seniors
All-star MVP: Paul Lee (UE)
Slam dunk contest: not held
Three-point shootout: Nate Matute (JRU)
Father-son 2-3 ball: Bong and Kiefer Ravena

Standings

Schools

Leagues

References

College men's basketball competitions in the Philippines